Brooklyn was an Italian professional cycling team that existed from 1970 to 1977. It was a mainly a one-day classics team and featured riders such as Roger De Vlaeminck, who won Paris–Roubaix four times. For the first three seasons it was sponsored by the Italian beer Dreher, and then for the following seasons by Italy's Brooklyn Chewing Gum.

The documentary film A Sunday in Hell features the team during the 1976 Paris–Roubaix.

References

Further reading

External links

Defunct cycling teams based in Italy
Cycling teams established in 1970
Cycling teams disestablished in 1977